The following Union Army units and commanders fought in the Battle of Stones River of the American Civil War. The Confederate order of battle is listed separately. Order of battle compiled from the army organization during the campaign, the casualty returns and the reports.

Abbreviations

Military rank
 MG = Major General
 BG = Brigadier General
 Col = Colonel
 Ltc = Lieutenant Colonel
 Maj = Major
 Cpt = Captain
 Lt = Lieutenant
 Sgt = Sergeant

Other
 w = wounded
 mw = mortally wounded
 k = killed
 c = captured

XIV Corps (Army of the Cumberland)
MG William S. Rosecrans, Commanding

General Staff and Headquarters
General Staff:
 Chief of Artillery and Ordnance: Col James Barnett
 Chief of Staff: Ltc Julius P. Garesché (k)
 Chief Quartermaster: Ltc John W. Taylor
 Chief Commissary: Ltc Samuel Simmons
 Judge-Advocate-General: Maj Ralston Skinner
 Inspector of Artillery: Cpt Jeremiah H. Gilman
 Assistant Inspector General: Cpt James Curtis
 Provost Marshal General: Cpt William M. Wiles
 Chief of Topographical Engineers: Cpt Nathaniel Michler
 Signal Corps: Cpt Jesse Merill

General Headquarters:

Provost Guard:
 10th Ohio: Ltc Joseph W. Burke
General Escort:
 Anderson Troop, Pennsylvania Cavalry: Lt Thomas S. Maple

Right Wing
MG Alexander McD. McCook

Center
MG George H. Thomas

 Provost Guard: 9th Michigan: Col John G. Parkhurst

Left Wing
MG Thomas L. Crittenden

 Chief of Artillery: Cpt John Mendenhall

Cavalry
BG David S. Stanley

Engineers

Notes

References
 Cozzens, Peter. No Better Place to Die: The Battle of Stones River. Urbana: University of Illinois Press, 1990. .
 The Battle of Murfreesboro
 U.S. War Department, The War of the Rebellion: a Compilation of the Official Records of the Union and Confederate Armies, U.S. Government Printing Office, 1880–1901.

American Civil War orders of battle